Below is a list of the head coaches of the Shakhtar football club (Donetsk, Ukraine), their statistics and achievements in the club.

"Miner" ("Coal Miners" (1936), "Stakhanovets" (1936–46 years), "Shakhtar" (since 1946)) is a Ukrainian football club from the city of Donetsk playing in the Premier League of Ukraine. The first and only among Ukrainian clubs to win the UEFA Cup. Winner of the USSR Super Cup, four-time winner of the USSR Cup, thirteen-time champion of Ukraine, thirteen-time winner of the Ukrainian Cup, nine-time winner of the Ukrainian Super Cup.

The first official match in the Soviet Top League "Coal miners" played in Kazan against the local team "Dynamo" and lost with a score of 1:4. The first coach of the club was Nikolay Grigoryevich Naumov. The club has been led by 34 head coaches throughout its history, he last of which, on June 14, 2022, was the Croatian coach – Igor Jovićević.

Most matches (574 or according to other information 573) the club spent under the coach - Mircea Lucescu, who headed Shakhtar Donetsk from 2004 to 2016. Lucescu also ranks first in the number of victories - 389.

List of coaches  
Information correct as of March 13, 2023. Only official matches are included in the statistics.

References

External links
 Official website
 List of head coaches (Segodnya.ua)
 List of head coaches (Footballfacts.ru)

 
Football clubs in Donetsk